David Sánchez may refer to:

Politics
 David Sánchez Juliao (1945–2011), Colombian author and diplomat
 David Sánchez Camacho (born 1963), Mexican politician
 David Sánchez Heredia (born 1966), Bolivian politician
 David Sánchez Guevara (born 1974), Mexican politician
 David Luna Sánchez (born 1975), Colombian politician
 David Sanchez (activist), Chicano activist

Sports
 David Sánchez (tennis) (born 1978), Spanish tennis player
 David Sánchez (footballer, born 1978), Spanish footballer
 David Sánchez (footballer, born 1982), Spanish football player
 David Sánchez (boxer) (1992–2017), Mexican boxer
 David Sánchez (weightlifter) (born 1994), Spanish weightlifter
 David Sánchez (footballer, born 1998), Spanish footballer

Others
 David Sánchez Morales (1925–1978), American Central Intelligence Agency operative
 David Sánchez (musician) (born 1968), Puerto Rican saxophonist

See also
 David Sancious (born 1953), American multi-instrumentalist, best known as keyboard and guitar player